Agrianthus is a genus of flowering plants in the family Asteraceae described as a genus in 1836.

The entire genus is endemic to Brazil.

 Species

References

Eupatorieae
Asteraceae genera
Endemic flora of Brazil